is a video game industry developer headquartered in Aoyama, Tokyo, Japan.

Founded on February 2, 1987, KAZe is well known for developing various pachinko and pinball video games.

Their services include the development of Web sites, system consultation, and IT consultation. The planning, producing, and management of cell phones is another one of KAZe's secondary businesses as a part of their diverse business plan.

Video games

 Zombie Nation (1990)
 Tenjin Oyasen 2 (1992)
 The King of Rally (1992)
 Pachinko Monogatari: Pachi-Slot Moaru Deyo!! (Super Famicom, 1993, published by KSS)
 Super Pinball: Behind the Mask (1993)
 Uchuu Race: Astro Go! Go! (1994)
 Pachi-Slot Monogatari: Universal Special (Super Famicom, 1994, published by KSS)
 Pachinko Monogatari 2: Nagoya Shachihoko no Teiou (Super Famicom, 1995, published by KSS)
 Pachi-Slot Monogatari: Paru Kougyou Special (Super Famicom, 1995, published by KSS)
 Super Pinball II: The Amazing Odyssey (1995)
 Power Rangers Zeo Full Tilt Battle Pinball (1996, published by Bandai)
 Digital Pinball: Last Gladiators (Sega Saturn, 1995)
 Digital Pinball: Necronomicon (Sega Saturn, 1996)
 Digital Pinball: Last Gladiators Ver. 9.7 (Sega Saturn, 1997)
 Kamen Rider (PlayStation, 1998, published by Bandai)
 Punch the Monkey! Game Edition (2000)
 Kamen Rider V3 (2000)
 Kamen Rider Kuuga (2000)
 Kamen Rider Agito (PlayStation, 2001, published by Bandai)
 Network Boukenki Bug Site (Game Boy Color, 2001, published by Smilesoft)
 Akira Psycho Ball (2002)
 Buile Baku (known in Europe as Detonator) (PlayStation 2, 2002, published by Kadokawa Shoten)
 Ultraman (2004)
 Shin Megami Tensei Pinball: Judgement (2006, Atlus)

External links 
  (archived)
 MobyGames
 List of KAZe games at GameFAQs

Video game companies of Japan
Video game development companies
Video game publishers
Software companies based in Tokyo
Video game companies established in 1987
Japanese companies established in 1987